William Mackersy (6 May 1875 – 27 February 1959) was a New Zealand cricketer. He played four first-class matches for Otago between 1906 and 1908.

See also
 List of Otago representative cricketers

References

External links
 

1875 births
1959 deaths
New Zealand cricketers
Otago cricketers
People from Alexandra, New Zealand